New Zealand–Singapore relations refer to the bilateral relations between the Republic of Singapore and New Zealand. Singapore has a high commission in Wellington. Likewise, New Zealand has a high commission in Singapore. Both Singapore and New Zealand are members of the Commonwealth of Nations, Asia Pacific Economic Cooperation (APEC), and the Five Power Defence Arrangements pact.

From 1974 to 1989, the New Zealand Force South East Asia maintained a joint military base in Singapore.

Singapore is New Zealand's fifth-largest trading partner, with a total of NZ$6.56 billion (S$6.08 billion) in two-way trade in 2021.

References

External links
 Relations between New Zealand and Singapore

 
Singapore
Bilateral relations of Singapore